Post of Kosovo (Pošta Kosova) is the company responsible for postal service in Kosovo. It is a subsidiary of Post and Telecommunication of Kosovo, Kosovo's largest telecommunications provider. The company was founded on 21 December 1959 in Pristina.

See also
Postage stamps and postal history of Kosovo
Postal codes in Kosovo

External links

Communications in Kosovo
Communications in Serbia
Kosovo